John Howard "Pondoro" Taylor (1904–1969) was a big-game hunter and ivory poacher of Irish descent. Born in Dublin as the son of a surgeon he developed an urge to go to Africa and become a professional hunter. Taylor mainly hunted for his own account and had little interest in guiding clients. His parents paid for his passage to Cape Town. In Africa he experimented extensively with different types of rifles and calibers which made him an expert in big game rifles. He is credited with developing the Taylor KO Factor, and authored several books. John Taylor died in 1969 in London.

Biography
Although Taylor used various firearms for his work as a hunter, he preferred the expensive, British double rifles over anything else, especially when tackling dangerous game.  His fondness for such cartridges as the .450/.400 Nitro-Express, .500/.465 Nitro-Express and .375 Holland & Holland Magnum are expressed again and again in his writing.  Of the 450/.400 he says,   Speaking of the .375 Magnum (a cartridge still sold) he writes, 
Having hunted over thirty years on the African continent, Taylor killed over 1,000 elephants, many of these illegally.

Taylor's personal life in later years was one of misfortune.  As an alleged homosexual, Taylor was persecuted in Africa in his latter years there and was eventually forced by local authorities to leave Africa due to his continued poaching offences. Taking into account his vast experience as a hunter, as well as his expertise with rifles, Taylor should have had no trouble finding a well paying job as a representative of one of the high end gunmakers in London.  However, whispers alluding to Taylor's homosexual past in Africa followed him to England, and he found little work available.  Taylor's last years were spent in poverty.

Books
Among the books he wrote include:
Big Game and Big Game Rifles (1948)
African Rifles and Cartridges (1948)
Pondoro: Last of the Ivory Hunters (1955)
Shadows of Shame (a novel) (1956)
Maneaters and Marauders (1959)

See also
 List of famous big game hunters

References

1904 births
1969 deaths
Irish writers
Irish hunters
People from Dublin (city)
Elephant hunters
Poachers